Seltenbach is a river of Baden-Württemberg, Germany. It flows into the Neckar near Rottenburg am Neckar.

See also
List of rivers of Baden-Württemberg

References

Rivers of Baden-Württemberg
Rivers of Germany